Marxism–Leninism–Maoism (MLM) is a political philosophy that synthesizes and builds upon Marxism–Leninism and Maoism. Its proponents refer to Marxism–Leninism–Maoism as Maoism and Maoism as Mao Zedong Thought (MZT) or Marxism–Leninism–Mao Zedong Thought. Marxism–Leninism–Maoism was first formalized by the Shining Path in 1982 although Marxism-Leninism-Maoism was proclaimed as a central tenet of the North Kalimantan Communist Party in 1969.

The synthesis of Marxism–Leninism–Maoism did not occur during the life of Mao Zedong. From the 1960s, groups that called themselves Maoist or which upheld Maoism were not unified around a common understanding of Maoism and had instead their own particular interpretations of the political, philosophical, economical and military works of Mao; these disorganized ideological trends comprised, and still comprise, Mao Zedong Thought. Adherents of Marxism–Leninism–Maoism claim it to be a unified, coherent higher stage of Marxism and that it was not synthesized until the 1980s through the experience of the people's war waged by the Shining Path in Peru. This led the Shining Path to posit Marxism–Leninism–Maoism as the newest development of Marxism.

Marxism–Leninism–Maoism has grown and developed significantly, serving as an animating force of revolutionary movements in countries such as Brazil, Colombia, Ecuador, India, Nepal and the Philippines. It has also led to efforts being undertaken towards the constitution or reconstitution of communist parties in countries such as Austria, France, Germany, Sweden and the United States.

Components

New Democracy 

The theory of New Democracy holds that the national-bourgeois in semi-feudal and semi-colonial countries has a dual character in that although it is an exploitative capitalist force, it can also but not always side with the proletariat against colonialism, imperialism and the comprador-bourgeoisie (whose existence is due to imperialism).

Much like the New Economic Policy in Russia, New Democracy is conceived of as a necessary (but temporary) stage for the long-term development of socialism, or in this case for the construction and consolidation of socialism in the first place. It holds that the national-bourgeois in the New Democratic stage must always be firmly under the command of the proletariat and they must be firmly dispensed with as soon as the national situation allows (in other words, when the contradiction between feudalism and the masses is no longer the primary contradiction of the nation, or when the bourgeois-democratic revolution is at a sufficiently advanced stage) for an outright dictatorship of the proletariat.

Mass line 

Building on the theory of the vanguard party by Vladimir Lenin, the theory of the mass line outlines a strategy for the revolutionary leadership of the masses, consolidation of the dictatorship of the proletariat and strengthening of the party and for the building of socialism. The mass line can be summarized by the phrase "from the masses, to the masses". It has three components or stages:
 Gathering the diverse ideas of the masses.
 Processing or concentrating these ideas from the perspective of revolutionary Marxism, in light of the long-term, ultimate interests of the masses (which the masses themselves may sometimes only dimly perceive) and in light of a scientific analysis of the objective situation.
 Returning these concentrated ideas to the masses in the form of a political line which will actually advance the mass struggle toward revolution.

These three steps should be applied over and over again, reiteratively uplifting practice and knowledge to higher and higher stages.

Law of contradiction 

Marxist–Leninist–Maoists uphold Mao Zedong's philosophical works, particularly his work on dialectics in On Contradiction and on epistemology in On Practice.

Protracted people's war 

People's war is strategy for revolution which holds the following tenets:
 Any attempt to begin fighting with the bourgeoisie on its own terms, using the same tactics and strategies as they do would be crushed (Marxist–Leninist–Maoists cite that apart from the October Revolution every single revolutionary attempt that immediately used conventional warfare was crushed by the bourgeoisie).
 It cannot be predicted when the objective conditions for revolution will exist. Thus the subjective conditions—i.e. class consciousness—must be built long in advance.
 Seizure of state power generally does not happen in one fell swoop. A situation of dual power through the course of protracted people's war arises when the proletarian vanguard controls sections of the country at the same time as the bourgeoisie.
 The party cannot possibly hope to lead the proletariat in a seizure of power if it itself has no military experience. Thus military experience—i.e. experience gained through actually fighting, even if on a limited scale—must be gained long in advance of a seizure of power. In addition to being a necessary development towards the dictatorship of the proletariat, dual power is invaluable in providing this military experience (along with civil knowledge, fuel for propaganda efforts, material aid for the party and the expansion and improvement of the mass line).

In a joint document released in 1998, several Marxist–Leninist–Maoist communist parties affirmed the difference between the specific strategic line of protracted people's war and the more general and universally applicable people's war. Protracted people's war is identified as being a specific application of the concept of people's war to countries with a large population or majority of peasantry and involving encircling the cities from base areas of communist control in the countryside.

The issue of applying people's war to fully industrialized first world nations is the subject of much debate. Many Marxist–Leninist–Maoist organizations such as the Revolutionary Internationalist Movement have put forward that much of a hypothetical people's war in the First World would take place in urban areas.

Cultural Revolution 
Marxist–Leninist–Maoists draw heavily from the experiences and lessons of the Great Proletarian Cultural Revolution which sought to eradicate the bourgeois that arose within the vanguard party itself and to transform all aspects of the social superstructure. The catchphrase "class struggle continues, and is intensified, under socialism" is frequently used.

Marxist–Leninist–Maoists hold the primacy of the relations of production over the productive forces, criticize Joseph Stalin's line that bourgeois influence under an advanced stage of socialism is primarily due to external forces (to the almost complete exclusion of internal forces) and strongly reaffirm the base-superstructure dialectic (that the conscious transformation of the base on its own is not enough, but the superstructure must also be consciously transformed).

Differences from Mao Zedong Thought 
The three most notable differences between Marxism–Leninism–Maoism and Mao Zedong Thought are the following:
 Marxism–Leninism–Maoism is considered to be a higher stage of Marxism–Leninism, much like Marxism–Leninism is considered a higher stage of Marxism. However, Mao Zedong Thought is considered to just be Marxism–Leninism applied to the particularities of the Chinese Revolution.
 Marxism–Leninism–Maoism is considered to be universally applicable whilst aspects of Mao Zedong Thought are generally not.
 Marxism–Leninism–Maoism completely rejects the Three Worlds Theory of Mao Zedong Thought, considering it part of the right-wards turn in the Communist Party of China led by Deng Xiaoping near the end of Chairman Mao's life and a deviation from Marxist–Leninist theories of imperialism. Marxism–Leninism–Maoism–Gonzalo Thought only rejects Deng's application.

International influence 
Perhaps the most notable international was the Revolutionary Internationalist Movement (RIM). RIM was founded in 1984 and included such organizations as the Shining Path and the then-Communist Party of Nepal (Maoist), eventually known as the Unified Communist Party of Nepal (Maoist). Today, the RIM appears to be defunct or near defunct. The magazine associated with the RIM, A World to Win, has not published an issue since 2006, though A World to Win News Service still publishes regularly on the Internet. In addition, many of the one-time RIM organizations have become increasingly critical of each other and this has resulted in many public splits.

India 

The Communist Party of India (Maoist) is a Marxist–Leninist–Maoist political party which aims to overthrow the government of India. It was founded on 21 September 2004 through the merger of the Communist Party of India (Marxist–Leninist) People's War and the Maoist Communist Centre of India. The merger was announced to the public on 14 October the same year. In the merger, a provisional central committee was constituted, with the erstwhile people's war leader Muppala Lakshmana Rao (alias Ganapathi) as the general secretary. It is currently proscribed as a terrorist organization by the Indian government.

Manipur 
The Kangleipak Communist Party has claimed that Manipur was annexed by the Union of India under the guise of Manipur Merger Agreement of 1949. According to this Marxist–Leninist–Maoist group, the merger of Manipur with the Union of India was in blatant contradiction of relevant international law as the then king of Manipur no longer had the authority to sign the agreement following the establishment of a democratically elected government. According to the group's chairman Ibungo Ngangom, "the then king signed the merger instrument only under duress, or more precisely, at gunpoint and so the so-called Manipur merger agreement was null and void from the very beginning". The group is currently at war with the government India and its express primary goal is not only to have Manipur secede from India, but also to bring about a communist state in Manipur through the scientific socialism of Karl Marx.

Latin America 
Many significant Marxist–Leninist–Maoist groups exist across Latin America, including the Communist Party of Brazil (Red Fraction), the Communist Party of Chile (Red Fraction), the Communist Party of Ecuador–Red Sun, the Maoist Organization for the Reconstitution of the Communist Party of Colombia and the Revolutionary Nucleus for the Reconstitution of the Communist Party of Mexico.

Peru 
The Shining Path is a guerrilla insurgent organization in Peru. It was founded in 1968 by Abimael Guzmán. The Shining Path suffered a setback after the capture of Guzmán and much of the party leadership in 1992 as well as a takeover of the Main Regional Committee, the greater part of the People's Liberation Army and the liquidation of the main Base Areas. Nonetheless, the Shining Path continues to exist in the VRAEM area of Peru and continues to carry out military actions. This party is not to be confused with Militarized Communist Party of Peru, or the Peruvian Communist Party; of which it is unaffiliated.

Nepal 
The Unified Communist Party of Nepal (Maoist), a national communist party with a revolutionary background, is a follower of Marxism–Leninism–Maoism. However, the party has also developed its own guiding thought known as Marxism–Leninism–Maoism–Prachanda Path which was developed taking Nepal's political, sociological and geographical constraints into consideration.

The Communist Party of Nepal is another Marxist–Leninist–Maoist party in Nepal. It claims that the UCPN(M) is a revisionist organization and is continuing the people's war against the UCPN(M) government.

Philippines
In the Philippines, the Communist Party of the Philippines and its New People's Army has been raging since 1968. Its strength peaked during the dictatorial rule of Ferdinand Marcos and was the main bulk to overthrow the dictatorship due to its killings. However, it only resurfaced during the Second Great Rectification Movement. It maintains nearly 100 active guerrilla fronts throughout the Philippines today and is considered by the military as the main threat to national security.

United States 
The Revolutionary Communist Party, USA (RCP) was previously a Marxist–Leninist–Maoist political party in the United States. The RCP participated in the founding conference of the Revolutionary Internationalist Movement on 12 March 1984. The RCP signed the "Declaration of the Revolutionary Internationalist Movement" and supported the RIM's declaration "Long Live Marxism–Leninism–Maoism!" on 26 December 1993 which recognized "Marxism–Leninism–Maoism as the new, third and higher stage of Marxism". However, today the RCP uses the "New Synthesis of Communism" to describe its ideology, although they still call themselves Maoists. Because of this, the RCP has been accused of revisionism by several Marxist–Leninist–Maoist groups such as the Communist Party of India (Maoist) and the Revolutionary Communist Party of Canada.

The Red Guards was a Marxist–Leninist–Maoist collective of community organizers and mass workers founded in 2015.

References

Further reading 
 
 

Anti-revisionism
Authoritarianism
Eponymous political ideologies
Marxist schools of thought
Maoism
Marxism
Marxism–Leninism
Shining Path
Types of socialism